Elwyn Crebey John  (18 March 1936  – 21 August 2013) was a Church in Wales priest, most notably Archdeacon of Brecon from 1999 until 2003.

He was educated at St David's College, Lampeter and ordained in 1960. After  curacies in Pontardawe and Llandrindod Wells he was Vicar of Beguildy from 1966 to 1979. He was at Builth from 1979 until 1985; and Brecon from 1985 until 2001.

References

1936 births
2013 deaths
Archdeacons of Brecon
Alumni of the University of Wales, Lampeter
20th-century Welsh Anglican priests
21st-century Welsh Anglican priests